The 2005 CONCACAF and CONMEBOL Beach Soccer Championship, also known as the 2005 FIFA Beach Soccer World Cup qualifiers for (CONCACAF and CONMEBOL), was the first beach soccer championship for the Americas, held in March 2005, in Rio de Janeiro, Brazil.
Hosts Brazil won the championship, beating Uruguay in the final, whilst the United States beat Argentina in the third place play off to finish third and fourth respectively. These nations moved on to play in the 2005 FIFA Beach Soccer World Cup in Rio de Janeiro from May 8 to May 15.

Participating nations
CONCACAF:

CONMEBOL:

Group stage

Group A

Group B

Knockout stage

Winners

Final standings

References

Beach
FIFA Beach Soccer World Cup qualification (CONCACAF)
FIFA Beach Soccer World Cup qualification (CONMEBOL)
International association football competitions hosted by Brazil
Beach
2005 in beach soccer